The Crocodile Armoured Personnel Carrier or "Croc" is a Rhodesian armoured personnel carrier first introduced in 1977 and based on Japanese commercial trucks' chassis. It remains in use with the Zimbabwe National Army (ZNA).

General description 

Built on a Nissan, Toyota or Isuzu 5-tonne truck chassis, the Crocodile consisted of an open-topped hull or 'capsule' faceted at the sides, which were designed to deflect small-arms' rounds, and a flat bottom or 'deck' reinforced by a v-shaped 'crush box' meant to deflect landmine blasts. Three inverted U-shaped high 'Roll bars' were fitted to protect the fighting compartment from being crushed in case the vehicle turned and roll over after a mine detonation.

Protection
The Crocodile was appreciated for its protection against landmines and ambush, since its hull was made of welded ballistic 10mm mild steel plate, whilst the front windscreen and side windows had 40mm bullet-proof laminated glass. However, the heavy "Croc"'s hull added about 3 tonnes of armour to a commercial truck chassis nominally road rated at 7.5 tonnes, placing a strain especially on its clutch and brakes.

Armament 

Rhodesian "Crocs" were usually armed with a FN MAG-58 7.62mm Light Machine Gun (LMG), sometimes installed on a locally produced one-man machine gunner armoured turret to protect the gunner. Vehicles assigned to convoy escorting duties ('E-type') had a Browning M1919A4 7.62mm medium machine gun mounted on an open-topped, cylinder-shaped turret (dubbed 'the dustbin'), whilst those employed on 'externals' received a tall, square-shaped and fully enclosed MAG turret mounted on the roof over the commander's seat. The Zimbabwean vehicles after 1980 sported pintle-mounted Soviet-made 12.7mm and 14.5mm Heavy Machine Guns (HMG) instead.

Variants 

Troop-Carrying Vehicle (TCV) – is the standard IFV/APC fully protected version, armed with either a single LMG (Rhodesian SF 1978–79) or HMG (ZNA 1980–present) and capable of accommodating 16 infantrymen.
Convoy escorting version – designated 'E-type', this is a basic IFV/APC version fitted with a turret, either the 'dustbin' with Browning MG or the 'box' variant with MAG-58 LMG.
Light TCV version – standard IFV/APC version with scaled-down armour.
Jackal – unarmed civilian version employed by the Rhodesian Posts & Telecommunications Corporation (PTC).

Combat history 
The Crocodile APC was employed by the Rhodesian Light Infantry (RLI) late in the war on their cross-border covert raids ('externals') against ZIPRA and ZANLA guerrilla bases in the neighboring Countries, such as the September 1979 raid on the ZANLA's New Chimoio base in Mozambique (Operation "Miracle").

After independence, the Crocodile APC entered service with the Zimbabwe National Army (ZNA) in early 1980. In November that year, ZNA's "Crocs" were thrown into action against ZIPRA troops at the 1st Battle of Entumbane and later at the February 1981 2nd Battle of Entumbane (near Bulawayo, Matabeleland), and later again after February 1982 by helping to put down the Super-ZAPU insurgency also in Matabeleland.

During the Mozambican Civil War, they were employed by the ZNA forces in Mozambique guarding the Mutare-Beira oil pipeline in 1982–1993, and served with Zimbabwe troops in the ill-fated United Nations' peacekeeping mission in Somalia (UNOSOM I) from 1992 to 1994. During that assignment, a few "Crocs" were loaned to the U.S. Marines contingent for convoy escort and security duties in the Mogadishu area. The "Crocs" served with the ZNA contingent sent to the Democratic Republic of Congo during the Second Congo War from 1998 to 2002.

Operators 

 – About 40 vehicles still in service with the ZNA.

Former operators 
 – 130 vehicles in service with the Rhodesian Security Forces in 1977–1980 passed on to successor state. 
 – Unknown number in service with the U.S. Marines in Somalia 1992–1994.

Notes

See also
Bullet TCV
Hippo APC
Thyssen Henschel UR-416
Rhodesian Armoured Corps
MAP45 Armoured Personnel Carrier
MAP75 Armoured Personnel Carrier
Mine Protected Combat Vehicle
Weapons of the Rhodesian Bush War

References 

Laurent Touchard, Guerre dans le bush! Les blindés de l'Armée rhodésienne au combat (1964-1979), Batailles & Blindés Magazine n.º 72, April–May 2016, pp. 64–75.  (in French)
Neil Grant & Peter Dennis, Rhodesian Light Infantryman 1961–80, Warrior series 177, Osprey Publishing Ltd, Oxford 2015. 
Peter Abbott & Raffaele Ruggeri, Modern African Wars (4): The Congo 1960-2002, Men-at-arms series 492, Osprey Publishing Ltd, Oxford 2014. 
Peter Gerard Locke & Peter David Farquharson Cooke, Fighting Vehicles and Weapons of Rhodesia 1965–80, P&P Publishing, Wellington 1995. 
Peter Stiff, Taming the Landmine, Galago Publishing Pty Ltd., Alberton (South Africa) 1986. 
Robert K. Brown, The Black Devils, Soldier of Fortune Magazine, January 1979.

External links
Photos of the Crocodile in service with the RhACR in 1979
Crocodile Mine & Ambush Protected (MAP) Vehicle.
Rhodesian Mine Ambush Protected Vehicles 1975-80

Wheeled armoured personnel carriers
Armoured personnel carriers of the Cold War
Weapons of Rhodesia
Military vehicles introduced in the 1970s